Helmut Siber (born 16 May 1942) is an Austrian international footballer and coach.

References

1942 births
Living people
Association football forwards
Austrian footballers
Austria international footballers
Bundesliga players
FC Wacker Innsbruck players
Kickers Offenbach players
WSG Tirol players
DSV Leoben players
Austrian football managers
Austrian expatriate sportspeople in West Germany
Austrian expatriate footballers
Expatriate footballers in West Germany